Fob or FOB may refer to:

Entertainment 
 Fall Out Boy, an American rock band
 FOB (play), a 1981 play by David Henry Hwang

Fashion and technology 
 Fob pocket
 Key fob
 USB fob
 Watch fob

Medicine 
 Fecal occult blood
 Follow-on biologics

Military 
 Forward operating base
 Fractional Orbital Bombardment

Other uses 
 FOB (shipping), or Free on Board, an Incoterm
 Federal Office Building (disambiguation)
 Fixed odds betting terminal
 Fob James (born 1934), former governor of Alabama
 Fresh off the boat